The 2019 European Indoor Archery Championships was the 17th edition of the European Indoor Archery Championships. The event was held in Samsun, Turkey from February 26 to March 2, 2019.

Medal table

Medal summary

Recurve

Juniors

References

External links
Results
Results Book

European Indoor Championships
Archery European Indoor Championships
European Archery Championships
International archery competitions hosted by Turkey